The Barbuda People's Movement is a centre-left Barbudan nationalist political party in Antigua and Barbuda active only on the island of Barbuda. The party's symbol is the European fallow deer, national animal of Barbuda.

History
The party first contested a general election in 1989, in which they won a single seat. They held the seat in the 1994 and 1999. In the 2004 elections the candidates of the BPM (Trevor Walker) and the Barbuda People's Movement for Change both won 400 votes. In a rerun of the election on 20 April Walker received 408 votes, whilst BPMC candidate Arthur Nibbs won only 394. The party retained the seat again in the 2009 elections.

Barbuda’s secession request 
The government is taking the unprecedented step of presenting the matter to the Parliament after it received a letter from the Barbuda Council requesting that discussions commence on the separation of Barbuda from Antigua.

In the letter dated 31 August 2020, Council Secretary Paul Nedd informed Cabinet Secretary Konata Lee that the  Barbuda Council wished to secede from Antigua in order to determine a separate future for Barbuda and its people.

Electoral results

House of Representatives

Barbuda Council

References

Political parties in Antigua and Barbuda
Barbuda political parties
Political parties established in 1978
Regionalist parties
Independence movements
Separatism in Antigua and Barbuda